O Crime de Cravinhos is a 1920 Brazilian mystery film directed by Arturo Carrari.

Cast
Rodolfo Arena
Antônio de Camilles
Elvira de Camilles
Carmo Nacarato
Filippo Santoro
Fiorini Silva
Antônio Tagliaferro
Nicola Tartagliore
Humbertina Trimantini

External links
 

Brazilian mystery films
1920 films
Brazilian black-and-white films
Brazilian silent films
1920 mystery films
Films directed by Arturo Carrari